William S. Huffman (December 27, 1924 – July 10, 2019) was an American politician from the state of Michigan. Huffman served as mayor of Madison Heights, Michigan from 1961 to 1963. He then served in the Michigan House of Representatives, where he represented Oakland County's 6th district from 1963 to 1964, and then the 66th state House district from 1965 to 1974. He then served in the Michigan Senate, where he represented the 16th district from 1975 until his resignation in 1982.

References

1924 births
2019 deaths
Democratic Party members of the Michigan House of Representatives
Democratic Party Michigan state senators
Mayors of places in Michigan
20th-century American politicians